Sons of the East are an Australian indie folk trio formed in 2011 by Nic Johnston, Dan Wallage, and Jack Rollins. To date, they have released three EPs and a number of singles. The trio has performed at Festival of the Sun, SXSW, and Boardmasters Festival, among other international festivals.

History
Sons of the East released their debut self-titled EP in August 2013, with the leading single "Come Away". In November 2015, they released another EP, Already Gone.

Their third release, the EP Burn Right Through, came out in 2019 and featured the singles "Nothing Comes Easy", "Silver Lining", and "It Must Be Luck". ABC's Dan Condon said of the single, "It Must Be Luck is a guaranteed starter on just about every wedding playlist from here on in", while describing the band as a "rootsy, uber-chilled group with really close-knit harmonies and really strong, pretty songs."

In September 2022, the band released their first full-length studio album, Palomar Parade, stating, "Palomar Parade is all of our favourite songs written over the last two years... Some came to us in a day, some came to us over the course of a year, but all of them shone in the sometimes-brutal process of making a record."

Discography
Albums
 Palomar Parade (2022)

EPs
 Sons of the East (2013)
 Already Gone (2015)
 Burn Right Through (2019)

Singles
 "Hold On" (2013)
 "Into the Sun" (2015)
 "Lost Cause" (2016)
 "Hold On, We're Going Home (Live)" (2017)
 "My Repair" (2017)
 "Nothing Comes Easy" (2018)
 "Silver Lining" (2019)
 "It Must Be Luck" (2019)
 "You Ain't Going Nowhere" (2019)
 "Come Away" (2019)
 "Inappropriate Behaviour" (2020)
 "You Might Think" (2020)
 "On My Way" (2020)
 "Fool Me" (2021)
 "Millionaire" (2021)
 "Undone" (2022)
 "What I Do" (2022)

References

Australian folk music groups